A pandal in India and neighbouring countries, is a fabricated structure, either temporary or permanent, that is used at many places such as either outside a building or in an open area such as along a public road or in front of a house. This canopy or big tent is often used in a religious or other events that gathers people together, such as a wedding, fair, exhibition or festival.

In Hinduism

In Hinduism, a pandal is a temporary structure set up to usually venerate the god and goddess such as Ganesha during Ganesh Chaturthi, Krishna during Krishna Janmasthami or the Goddess Durga during Durga Puja, known as puja pandal. Pandals are also used for nonreligious activities. For instance, these tents are put up during cultural programs.

In Buddhism in Sri Lanka
In a ritual unique to Sri Lanka, Vesak thorana pandals are set up during the Vesak festival, with illuminated panels illustrated with episodes from the life of the Gautama Buddha and Jathaka Katha or stories based on Buddhist culture. 

The fundamental concept of a Vesak Pandal is a creatively made, massive structure, decorated with a large number of lights and paintings mounted on a huge supporting structure. This supporting structure is traditionally built with Puwak Gasa (Areca nut trees). Creating the structure requires creativity, inventiveness and the high-level expertise of a number of artists and light-system electricians, not to mention funding and planning in advance. The goal is to create a very beautiful and colorful experience. Many different and dedicated groups of experts participating often pass down this work from generation to generation or master to student. With change of time, nowadays Pandols are constructed using Scaffolding, which doesn't require cutting down of "Puwak" Trees as a result. 

The most significant part of this display uses simple techniques in an intelligent way to create lighting on the front of the pandal. Most of the time this is a 2D structure.

Other types of pandals
Pandals are also set up during Gammaduwa (village rebirth) festivals, honouring the goddess Pattini.

Pandal also refers to platforms from which people splash water during the new year celebrations of the Thingyan festival.

A pandal can also be a ceremonial gate, built to welcome visitors.

A city in the Nilgiris district of the state of Tamil Nadu is named Pandalur.

References

Festivals in India
Festivals in Sri Lanka
Objects used in Hindu worship
Buddhist practices
Architecture in India